Bangkok Glass Volleyball Club was a Thai professional volleyball club based in Pathum Thani Province and was managed by BG FC Sport Co.,Ltd. which was a subsidiary of Bangkok Glass Group of Companies.

Bangkok Glass FC played in the Thailand League after their club was founded in 2014. Their home stadium was BG Sport Hall which has a capacity of 4,000.

Bangkok Glass won their first Thailand League title in 2014–15 season and the Super League in 2015. In season 2014–15, Bangkok Glass were the triple champions winning the (2014–15 Thailand League, 2015 Thailand Super League, and 2015 Asian Club Championship).

The club dissolved on May 8, 2018, due to severe differences between the club's policy and the national federation's policy about the national team, the latter considered to suffocate the professional clubs. The licence was sold to Air Force Volleyball Club Company.

History
Bangkok Glass Volleyball Club (BGVC) managed by BGFC Sport Company Limited, was established in 2014 with the mission to elevate a standard of Thailand’s female volleyball sport industry and to promote and increase a popularity of the volleyball sport among Thais.

BGVC has strategically laid the basis for achieving the point of greatest success which can be shown through the team’s quality integration including management team, professional personnel, and players.

The first tournament Bangkok Glass Volleyball Club (BGVC) participated was Pro Challenge, 2014 (Division 1) in July 2014.
With an outstanding performances, BGVC wins the championship granting them a promotion to the highest level of competition;
the Volleyball Thailand League 2014-2015. The accomplishment can be evidently observed with the initial success which BGVC will keep on
triumphing through the years to come.

Stadium and locations

Honours

Domestic competitions
Senior team
 Thailand League 
  Champion (2): 2014–15, 2015–16
  Runner-up (2): 2016–17
  Third place (1): 2017–18
 Super League
  Champion (2): 2015, 2016
  Runner-up (2): 2017, 2018
 Pro Challenge 
  Champion (1): 2014
B team
 Kor Royal Cup
  Runner-up (2): 2016, 2017
U18 team
 Academy U18 League
  Third place (2): 2015,2016

International competitions
Major
 Asian Club Championship 2 appearances 
 2015 —  Champion
 2016 —  Third place
 World Club Championship 1 appearances 
 2016 — 7th place
Minor
Binh Dien International Cup
 2017 —  Champion

Former squad
As of January 2018

Notable players

Domestic Players

 Wilavan Apinyapong (loan)
 Natthanicha Jaisaen
 Anongporn Promrat
 Paweenut Rueangrum
 Pattrathip Santrakoon

Foreign Players

 Naoko Hashimoto (2015)

 Aleksandra Terzić (2015)

 Ashley Frazier (2016–2017)
 Jordanne Scott (2016)

 Tran Thi Thanh Thuy (2015–2016)
 Nguyen Thi Ngoc Hoa (2014–2017)

 Soňa Mikysková (2017)

 Anna Maria Spanou (2017–2018)

References

External links
 Official Website
 Club's dissolution 
 Licence transfer to Air Force Women's Volleyball Club 

Defunct volleyball clubs in Thailand
2014 establishments in Thailand
Volleyball clubs in Thailand
Women's volleyball teams
Volleyball clubs established in 2014
2018 disestablishments in Thailand
Volleyball clubs disestablished in 2018